Dry as a Bone is the second and final EP by the American rock band Green River. It was released in June 1987 through Sub Pop Records.

Overview
In June 1986, the band began production on its second EP with local producer Jack Endino at Reciprocal Recording in Seattle, Washington. Green River chose to record Dry As a Bone for Bruce Pavitt's new label, Sub Pop Records. However, Pavitt couldn't afford to release it until the following year, and, as had happened with Come On Down, the record was delayed. Dry As a Bone was finally released through Sub Pop Records in June 1987, a year after it was recorded. It was the new label's first non-compilation release. It was promoted by Sub Pop as "ultra-loose GRUNGE that destroyed the morals of a generation." The album's cover art was photographed by Charles Peterson. The song "Ozzie" was done originally by Tales of Terror.

Steve Huey of AllMusic has called it Green River's "strongest individual release...perfecting their sleazy, raucous fusion of '70s hard rock and post-hardcore punk." It was reissued in 1990 along with the album Rehab Doll (plus bonus tracks) as the Dry As a Bone/Rehab Doll compilation album. One of the bonus tracks from the reissue, "Searchin'" was recorded during the Dry As a Bone sessions.

In 2019, the album was re-released with a new mix by original producer Jack Endino, and 11 bonus tracks.

Track listing

Personnel
Jeff Ament – bass guitar, production, engineering
Mark Arm – vocals
Bruce Fairweather – guitar
Stone Gossard – guitar
Alex Vincent – drums
Jack Endino – production, engineering
Linda Owens – layout
Charles Peterson – photography

References

1987 EPs
Green River (band) albums
Grunge EPs
Sub Pop EPs
Albums produced by Jeff Ament